William Charles Piguenit (27 August 1836 – 17 July 1914) was an Australian landscape painter.

Early life
Piguenit was born in Hobart, Tasmania, to Frederick Le Geyt Piguenit and Mary Ann née Igglesden.  Frederick had been transported to Van Diemen's Land in 1830, with Mary Ann following him. They married in Hobart in 1833. His first artistic influences came from his mother, who set up a school for young ladies where she taught "French, music and drawing".

Career 
In 1850 he became a draftsman with the Tasmanian Lands & Survey Department, working in particular on the Geological Survey of Tasmania.  During this employment Piguenit provided lithographic illustrations for The Salmon Ponds and vicinity, New Norfolk, Tasmania. He took painting lessons from Scottish immigrant artist Frank C. Dunnett (1822–1891). Until he got a good price for a painting from Sir James Agnew, the Premier of Tasmania, he had little success as a painter. Piguenit left public service in 1873 to devote his time to painting. His painting of Tasmanian landscapes soon brought favourable reviews.  He was a participant in the exploration, description and surveying of the western part of Tasmania. The paintings he produced of western Tasmania were purchased by the Tasmanian government under a special act of parliament.

New South Wales
After moving to NSW in 1880 Piguenit's subjects included the Darling, Nepean and Hawkesbury Rivers as well as the Lane Cove River close to his Hunters Hill home. At this time he became one of the founders of the Art Society of New South Wales.  Later, during a visit to Tasmania he was noticed by Lady Hamilton, wife of Governor Robert Hamilton and many his drawings were purchased by the government for the Hobart gallery.

His Flood in the Darling was purchased for the National Art Gallery of New South Wales (now Art Gallery of New South Wales) in 1895. In 1898 and 1900 he visited Europe, exhibiting at London and Paris. Returning to Australia he won the Wynne Prize in 1901 with his Thunder storm on the Darling. In 1903 he was commissioned by the National Art Gallery of New South Wales trustees to paint Mount Kosciusko. By the end of the century he was regarded as the leading Australian-born landscape painter.

Death 
Piguenit died on 17 July 1914 at his home, "Saintonge", in the Sydney suburb of Hunters Hill. He was buried in the Field of Mars cemetery, where his headstone inscription reads: IN LOVING MEMORY OF WILLIAM CHARLES PIGUENIT DIED 17th JULY 1914; AGED 77 YEARS. "UNTO THE UPRIGHT THERE ARISETH LIGHT IN THE DARKNESS" (Field of Mars Cemetery: C of E, Sec. C. Grave 618).

Gallery

Collections

Art Gallery of New South Wales

Art Gallery of South Australia
 An Australian fjord, n.d.

Geelong Art Gallery

National Gallery of Australia
 Hell's Gates, Davey River, Tasmania, 1871
 Near Liverpool, New South Wales, c.1908
 On the Nepean, New South Wales, n.d.

National Library of Australia
 Mt. Olympus, Lake St. Clair, Tasmania, 1878
 On the Craycroft (i.e. Cracroft), Tasmania, 1878
 Tasmanian landscape, c. 1880
 Mount King William from Lake George, Tasmania, 1887

State Library of Tasmania
 On the Derwent, n.d.
 In the Grose Valley, 1887
 Lane Cove from below the Bridge, near Sydney N.S.Wales, n.d.

Tasmanian Museum and Art Gallery (TMAG)
 The Tower of Strength, c. 1900

See also
 Visual arts of Australia
 French Australian

Notes

Resources
 Diary, 1871, 1873, 1875, State Library of Queensland
 Account of trips from Hobart Town to Port Davey 14 February 1871 – 9 March 1871, from Hobart Town to Lake St. Clair 8 Feb. 1873-10 Mar. 1873 and from Hobart Town to Queensland 13 September 1875 – 13 October 1875, including i.a. notes concerning sketches, photographs and landscape scenery.

External links

 More works by Piguenit @ ArtNet
 WC Piguenit at the Art Gallery of New South Wales
 
 
 Joseph Davis, The Wild Man Who Turned Mild: the life and art of W.C. Piguenit 1836-1914[https://www.academia.edu/45441632/THE_WILD_MAN_WHO_TURNED_MILD_THE_LIFE_AND_ART_OF_W_C_PIGUENIT_1836_1914

1836 births
1914 deaths
Western Tasmania
Wynne Prize winners
19th-century Australian painters
19th-century Australian male artists
20th-century Australian painters
20th-century Australian male artists
Artists from Tasmania
Australian male painters